Buy Now... Saved Later is the second studio album by British metal band One Minute Silence, the follow-up to Available in All Colors. It was released in April 2000 on V2 Records and was dedicated "to the memory of Neville Anthony Lynch". In contrast to the hip-hop-metal tinge the first album had, Buy Now... Saved Later has a more traditional guitar-metal sound, produced by Colin Richardson.

The cover art features a woman with devil horns, seemingly made of (or at least covered with) dollar notes and holding a Bible in her right hand, and a bitten apple in the left (a reference to temptation). Behind her is a grey One Minute Silence logo which also appears on the CD, on a black background. The song "Holy Man" appears in the 2000 video game ECW Anarchy Rulz.

Performance 
Buy Now... Saved Later was One Minute Silence's highest-charting album, reaching number 61 in the UK Albums Chart.

Track listing 

The songs "It's Just a Ride" and "If I Can Change" were partly inspired by comedian Bill Hicks.

References 

2000 albums
One Minute Silence albums
V2 Records albums
Albums produced by Colin Richardson